Carson Porter (born in Charlotte, North Carolina) is an American soccer coach.

References

Living people
Sportspeople from Charlotte, North Carolina
Soccer players from Charlotte, North Carolina
American soccer coaches
Wilmington Hammerheads FC
North Carolina Tar Heels men's soccer players
Association footballers not categorized by position
Year of birth missing (living people)
North Carolina FC coaches
Wake Forest Demon Deacons men's soccer coaches
Denver Pioneers men's soccer coaches
Association football players not categorized by nationality